is the principal station of the Nagoya Railroad (Meitetsu) system in Nagoya, Japan. Most trains of Meitetsu's major lines operate through this station. The station is also a gateway to the Chūbu Centrair International Airport, which is connected with the station by the Rapid Express service started on January 29, 2005.

This station is built under the Meitetsu Department Store, therefore the station area is very narrow for the large number of passengers, but it is technically difficult to enlarge the station due to the limited and complicated underground area. Therefore, at this station, passengers' waiting spots are separated by destination. Passengers are required to wait at their spot to go.

The station is adjacent to JR Central's Nagoya Station, the city's central station, and Kintetsu Nagoya Station, the terminal of the Kintetsu Nagoya Line.

Ticket Gates 
There are 7 ticket gates at Meitetsu Nagoya Station, including the Central Ticket Gate, West Ticket Gate, South Ticket Gate, North Ticket Gate, East Ticket Gate, New South Ticket Gate and Kintetsu Connection Ticket Gate.

The Central Ticket Gate, West Ticket Gate, and South Ticket Gate are located in the Meitetsu station building, and the North Ticket Gate can be accessed from the Gatewalk Underground Shopping Mall.

The East Ticket Gate and New South Ticket Gate are only for entrance to Platform 4. The East Ticket Gate is near the underground lottery sales kiosk, and the New South Ticket Gate is at the back of the Meitetsu department store underground food section.

The Kintetsu connection ticket gate connects Platform 1 to the Kintetsu Nagoya Station platforms.

Riding spots
At Meitetsu Nagoya Station, passengers' riding spots are separated by their destinations. Additionally, Meitetsu has two-door trains and three-door trains, therefore passengers are required to wait at the spot with light on.

Track No.1 (for Ichinomiya, Gifu, Iwakura, Inuyama, Shin Kani, Kakamigahara, Tsushima and Saya)

There are only very few local trains for Gifu, so passengers should use local trains for Tsushima or transfer at Sukaguchi.

Track No.2 (for Ichinomiya, Gifu, Inuyama, Shin Unuma, Shin Kani and Saya)
Track No.3 (for Toyohashi, Nishio, Tokoname, Central Japan International Airport, Kōwa and Utsumi)
These tracks are used only for passengers with seat reservation for a □ μSky Limited Express, □ Rapid Limited Express and ■ Limited Express and for arrival.

Track No.4 (for Higashi Okazaki, Toyohashi, Toyokawa-inari, Nishio, Tokoname, Central Japan International Airport, Kōwa and Utsumi)

Transfer
At Nagoya Station:
Central Japan Railway Company
Tōkaidō Shinkansen (for Shin-Yokohama, Tokyo, Kyoto and Shin-Osaka)
Tōkaidō Line (for Gifu, Ogaki, Obu, Kariya, Gamagori, Toyohashi and Hamamatsu)
Chūō Line (for Kozoji (transfer to EXPO SITE), Tajimi and Nakatsugawa)
Kansai Line (for Yokkaichi, Tsu and Kameyama)
Takayama Line (Limited Express only, for Gero and Takayama)
Nagoya Seaside Rapid Railway
Aonami Line (for Kinjō-Futō) – Station number: AN01
Nagoya Municipal Subway
Higashiyama Line – Station number: H08
Sakura-dōri Line – Station number: S02
At Kintetsu Nagoya Station:
Kintetsu Railway
Nagoya Line (for Yokkaichi, Tsu, Ise-Nakagawa, Matsusaka, Iseshi, Toba, Kashikojima and Osaka)

History

The station opened on August 12, 1941 and was known as  until it was renamed in early 2005.

A station refurbishment project including the construction of two new platforms in order to increase the station capacity will be completed by 2027, the year that the maglev Shinkansen is expected to be put into operation.

Adjacent stations

References

External links

 

Railway stations in Aichi Prefecture
Railway stations in Japan opened in 1941